Achint Kaur is an Indian television and Cinema actresses and is best known for playing the antagonists Mandira and Pallavi in Ekta Kapoor's Indian soap operas Kyunki Saas Bhi Kabhi Bahu Thi and Kahaani Ghar Ghar Kii, respectively, on Star Plus. She is also the voice behind Shenzi character played in the movie The Lion King (Hindi version). She was also seen playing a mother and a mother-in-law in the serial Jamai Raja.

Early life 
Achint Kaur was born and raised in Meerut, Uttar Pradesh to a Punjabi Sikh family where she studied at Sophia Girls' School.

Career
She started her career with Zee TV's popular show Banegi Apni Baat in 1994, and worked in Swabhimaan in 1995 in which she played the role of 'Soha'. 

Besides working in some of the popular drama series, she has also played many roles in Bollywood movies, such as Om Jai Jagadish, Corporate, & Julie. She has also won numerous awards for her strong character driven roles. These include the ITA Award for "Best Actress in Supporting Role" for her series Virrudh. As of 2014 she is working in Zee TV's Punjabi/Gujarati theme serial Jamai Raja (2014 TV series). 

She is a theatre actress and recently appeared in the play "Two to Tango, Three to Jive". Kaur has also acted in a few Pakistani television serials.

Filmography

Television

References

External links
 
 
 
 
 Achint Kaur News Article

Living people
Year of birth missing (living people)
People from Meerut
Actresses from Mumbai
Indian film actresses
Indian television actresses
Indian soap opera actresses
Punjabi people
Indian Sikhs
Actresses in Hindi cinema
Actresses in Hindi television
Actresses in Urdu television
Indian expatriate actresses in Pakistan
20th-century Indian actresses
21st-century Indian actresses